The Parachutes Tour was the first concert tour undertaken by British rock band Coldplay. It was announced on 1 June 2000 in support of their debut album, Parachutes (2000), following the unnamed concert run they co-headlined with Welsh band Terris. They mostly performed at clubs, theatres and festivals, while the set list included all tracks from the concert run's namesake album along with songs from The Blue Room (1999), covers and unreleased material.

According to Billboard, the performances held during 2001 grossed an average of $52,743 from 2,507 tickets sold per date. In total, the tour grossed $4,201,871 from 262,140 tickets.

Background
After numerous one-off performances and a few shows with Bellatrix in support of The Blue Room (1999), Coldplay was part of the NME Premier Tour in January 2000 and embarked on a co-headlining run with Terris in March. On 27 April 2000, the band announced their first headlining tour would be coming to the United Kingdom right after supporting Muse at Showbiz Tour.

Opening acts
Except for London, English band Lowgold opened all October 2000 performances. Bettina Motive and the Fantastic Super Foofs supported the 18 December one-off show. During the first North American leg, Lily Frost guested in Vancouver and remaining dates featured Powderfinger. Grandaddy was invited for the continent's second run. Additionally, Copenhagen had Swan Lee.

Set list
This set list was taken from the band's 24 June 2000 concert in Pilton, United Kingdom. It does not represent all shows throughout the tour.

 "Spies"
 "Don't Panic"
 "High Speed"
 "Shiver"
 "Trouble"
 "Yellow"
 "Everything's Not Lost"
 "You Only Live Twice" (Nancy Sinatra cover)

Tour dates

Cancelled shows

See also
 List of Coldplay live performances
 List of highest-grossing live music artists

Notes

References

External links
Coldplay Official Website

2000 concert tours
2001 concert tours
Coldplay concert tours
Concert tours of Asia
Concert tours of Australia
Concert tours of Belgium
Concert tours of Canada
Concert tours of Denmark
Concert tours of Europe
Concert tours of France
Concert tours of Germany
Concert tours of Ireland
Concert tours of Italy
Concert tours of Japan
Concert tours of New Zealand
Concert tours of Norway
Concert tours of North America
Concert tours of Oceania
Concert tours of Portugal
Concert tours of Singapore
Concert tours of Spain
Concert tours of Sweden
Concert tours of the Netherlands
Concert tours of the United Kingdom
Concert tours of the United States